Sassy Swings Again is a 1967 studio album by Sarah Vaughan. This was Vaughan's last album for Mercury Records, and her last studio recording for four years.

Reception

The Allmusic review by Stephen Cook awarded the album four stars and said that Vaughan was in her "autumnal prime" and the album was "an often overlooked but essential session from that most divine of jazz chanteuses".

Track listing
 "Sweet Georgia Brown" (Ben Bernie, Maceo Pinkard, Kenneth Casey) - 1:50
 "Take the "A" Train" (Billy Strayhorn) - 2:39
 "I Left My Heart in San Francisco" (George Cory, Douglass Cross) - 4:06
 "S'posin'" (Paul Denniker, Andy Razaf) - 3:08
 "Every Day I Have the Blues" (Memphis Slim) - 4:22
 "I Want to Be Happy" (Irving Caesar, Vincent Youmans) - 2:19
 "All Alone" (Irving Berlin) - 2:19
 "The Sweetest Sounds" (Richard Rodgers) - 4:30
 "On the Other Side of the Tracks" (Cy Coleman, Carolyn Leigh) - 3:35
 "I Had a Ball" (Jack Lawrence, Stan Freeman) - 2:17

Personnel
Sarah Vaughan - vocals
Manny Albam - arranger
Thad Jones - arranger
Bob James - arranger, piano
J.J. Johnson - arranger, trombone
Malcolm Little - liner notes
Phil Woods - Reeds (Multiple), alto saxophone
Benny Golson - Reeds (Multiple), saxophone
Kai Winding - trombone
Freddie Hubbard - trumpet
Joe Newman
Charlie Shavers
Clark Terry

References

Mercury Records albums
Sarah Vaughan albums
1967 albums
Albums produced by Hal Mooney
Albums arranged by Thad Jones